San-Pédro Department is a department of San-Pédro Region in Bas-Sassandra District, Ivory Coast. In 2021, its population was 790,242 and its seat the settlement of San-Pédro. The sub-prefectures of the department are Doba, Dogbo, Gabiadji, Grand-Béréby, and San-Pédro.

History
San-Pédro Department was created in 1988 as a first-level subdivision via a split-off from Sassandra Department.

In 1997, regions were introduced as new first-level subdivisions of Ivory Coast; as a result, all departments were converted into second-level subdivisions. San-Pédro Department was included in Bas-Sassandra Region.

In 2011, districts were introduced as new first-level subdivisions of Ivory Coast. At the same time, regions were reorganised and became second-level subdivisions and all departments were converted into third-level subdivisions. At this time, San-Pédro Department became part of San-Pédro Region in Bas-Sassandra District.

Notes

Departments of San-Pédro Region
1988 establishments in Ivory Coast
States and territories established in 1988